Millville is a settlement in Newfoundland and Labrador near the Codroy Valley. The community of Millville got its name circa the 1940s, when a Mr. Alexander Gale moved in from the coast and established a carding mill there. Formerly, people lived along the seacoast at Net Cove. The Gales and Jennings were the first families to move inward and start the community of Millville. The carding mill was in operation from 1893 to 1975. Mr. Gale and his eight sons all ran the operation at one time or another. The machinery was brought in by Mr. Gale from Nova Scotia and he later set up other mills in the area. There were 16 machines in operation at one time. Mr. Gale kept his machines in operation 24 hours a day and produced about 500 pounds of wool per day. The mill operated in two shifts of 12 hours each and usually 8 people were employed. For 50 years the mill was operated by water power, in later years the machinery was run by diesel. The old mill located further down the road from the present site. Mr. Alex Gale also operated a small grocery store. Goods were bought on a bartering system. There was a Catholic school built in Millville about 70 years ago. Some early teachers were: Elizabeth O'Quinn, Angela Blanchard, and Hughie O'Quinn. Another school was later built to replace this one. Today, however, school has been centralized to Upper Ferry and students from all over the Valley are bussed there to attend classes. The first post office was kept in Mr. Alex gale's store for 50 years or more. It was then taken over by his son, Afra. In later years mailbox delivery was instituted.

Populated places in Newfoundland and Labrador